State Route 129 (SR 129) is a primary state highway in the U.S. state of Virginia.  The state highway runs  from U.S. Route 501 (US 501) in South Boston north to US 501 at Centerville.  SR 129 is the old alignment of US 501 and its predecessor, old SR 18, in central Halifax County.

Route description

SR 129 begins in downtown South Boston at an intersection with southbound US 501, which comes from the northwest as two-way Wilborn Avenue and heads south as one-way Main Street.  SR 129 heads northeast on Main Street, whose next intersection is with northbound US 501, which follows one-way Broad Street.  The state highway curves northward and meets the west end of SR 34 (Hodges Street).  SR 129 becomes Old Halifax Road  shortly before making a westward curve to reach its northern terminus at US 501 (Halifax Road) in the hamlet of Centerville.

Major intersections

References

External links

Virginia Highways Project: VA 129

129
State Route 129
U.S. Route 501